Carl Hermann Bachmann (7 October 1864 – 5 July 1937) was a German operatic baritone, opera director and singing teacher.

Life 
Born in Cottbus, Bachmann, who initially became a merchant, took singing lessons with Gustav Schmidt in Berlin. He made his debut as a singer in 1890 at the Stadttheater in Halle an der Saale, where he remained until 1894. From 1894 to 1897, he worked at the Nuremberg City Theatre. From 1897 to 1918, he joined the Berlin Court Opera, where he also worked as a director from 1910. Later he worked as a singing teacher. 

Bachmann died in Berlin at the age of 72.

Footnotes

References

Further reading 
 Ludwig Eisenberg: Großes biographisches Lexikon der Deutschen Bühne im XIX. Jahrhundert. Paul List publishing house, Leipzig 1903,.
 K. J. Kutsch, Leo Riemens: Großes Sängerlexikon. K. G. Saur, Bern, 1993, first volume A–L, Sp. 126,

External links 

 Bachmann, Hermann on 
 Klaus Ulrich Spiegel: Tönendes Denkmal – Der stimmgewaltige Bassbariton Hermann Bachmann on ku-spiegel.de

1864 births
1937 deaths
People from Cottbus
People from the Province of Brandenburg
German opera directors
German operatic baritones
Voice teachers